Cryptantha ambigua is a species of flowering plant in the borage family known by the common name basin cryptantha. It is native to western North America from British Columbia to California to Colorado, where it grows in many types of habitat, including forest, scrub, and sagebrush.

Description
It is an annual herb producing a branching stem 10 to 35 centimeters tall covered in stiff hairs. The hairy to bristly leaves are up to 4 centimeters long. The inflorescence is a linear array of developing fruits with a dense clump of open flowers at the tip. The bristly white five-lobed flowers are 3 or 4 millimeters wide.

References

External links
Jepson Manual Treatment
Photo gallery

ambigua
Flora of the Northwestern United States
Flora of the Southwestern United States
Flora of British Columbia
Flora of California
Flora of the California desert regions
Flora of the Cascade Range
Flora of the Klamath Mountains
Flora of the Sierra Nevada (United States)
Natural history of the California chaparral and woodlands
Natural history of the California Coast Ranges
Natural history of the Central Valley (California)
Natural history of the Peninsular Ranges
Natural history of the San Francisco Bay Area
Natural history of the Transverse Ranges
Plants described in 1885
Flora without expected TNC conservation status